is a railway station on the Chikuhi Line of Kyushu Railway Company (JR Kyushu), located in Karatsu, Saga Prefecture, Japan.

Lines

Station layout 
The station, which is unstaffed, consists of a side platform serving a single track at grade. There is no station building but a shelter is provided on the platform. In addition, a waiting room named "Sakura-kan" (meaning Cherry Blossom Room) has been set up near the station entrance. A bike shed is provided nearby.

Adjacent stations

History
This station was opened on the same day as an intermediate station on the new track under the name . The Kitakyushi Railway was nationalised on 1 October 1937 and Japanese Government Railways (JGR) assumed control of the station, renamed it Hizen-Kubo and designated the track which served it as part of the Chikuhi Line. With the privatization of Japanese National Railways (JNR), the successor of JGR, on 1 April 1987, control of the station passed to JR Kyushu.

Passenger statistics
In fiscal 2015, there were a total of 5,125 boarding passengers, giving a daily average of 14 passengers.

Environs
National Route 203

References

External links
Hizen-Kubo Station (JR Kyushu)

Railway stations in Saga Prefecture
Stations of Kyushu Railway Company
Chikuhi Line
Railway stations in Japan opened in 1935